Ariyanipatti is a village in the Gandaravakottai revenue block of Pudukkottai district, Tamil Nadu, India.

Demographics 
As per the 2001 census, Ariyanipatti had a total population of 1563 with 796 males and 767 females. Out of the total population 879 people were literate.

References

Villages in Pudukkottai district